Lucius Vibius Sabinus was a Roman Senator who lived in the 1st century. His daughter Vibia Sabina married the emperor Hadrian.

Biography
Little is known about his family, but Sabinus came from a family of consular rank. He may have been related to Lucius Junius Quintus Vibius Crispus, three times consul, and his brother Quintus Vibius Secundus, consul in 86. 

Sabinus became the second husband of Trajan's niece Salonia Matidia; he and Matidia had a daughter, Vibia Sabina (August 13th 83-136/137). Sabinus may have died soon after his daughter's birth, for in his funeral speech for Matidia, the emperor Hadrian alludes to her long widowhood.  Vibia Sabina married her distant maternal cousin and Trajan's heir, the future emperor Hadrian sometime before the year 101.

Ronald Syme has argued that a pair of fragmentary inscriptions from Asisium refer to Sabinus; If correct, this would mean he was a member of the septemviri epulonum, one of the four most prestigious ancient Roman priesthoods. Syme has also argued that, based on a reading preserved in later copies of the Fasti Consulares indicating that Sabinus and Arrius Antoninus were consular colleagues, which means he was suffect consul in the year 97—a reading Theodor Mommsen had judged as unreliable. Anthony Birley accepted Syme's argument. In his own study on the suffect consuls of the year 97, Fausto Zevi rejected Syme's argument on several grounds, and argued that "Sabinus" in the later fasti was a corruption for "Piso"—Calpurnius Piso, the name which this portion of the Fasti Ostienses supports. Zevi also dismisses the identification of Sabinus with the inscriptions from Asisium as based on insufficient information.

Based on an inscription that preserves Hadrian's funeral oration on his dead wife Matidia, Sabinus had died no later than the year 98.

References

Further reading 
 Julian Bennett, Trajan: Optimus Princeps : a Life and Times (London: Routledge, 1997) ,

External links 
 R. Scott Moore, "The Stemmata [sic] of the Good Emperors"

1st-century Romans
Ancient Roman politicians
Senators of the Roman Empire
Suffect consuls of Imperial Rome
Epulones of the Roman Empire
Sabinus